Milan Peschel (born 1968) is a German actor. He appeared in more than fifty films since 1999.

Selected filmography

References

External links 

1968 births
Living people
German male film actors